South Robertson is an area on the Westside of Los Angeles that is served by the South Robertson neighborhood council.  It contains the following city neighborhoods: Beverlywood, Castle Heights, Cheviot Hills, Crestview, La Cienega Heights and Reynier Village. The area is notable as a center for the Jewish community.

Geography

Boundaries

According to the South Robertson Neighborhood Council's map, South Robertson is bounded roughly by the Santa Monica Freeway and Venice Boulevard on the south, La Cienega Boulevard on the east, Gregory Way (to Robertson) on the north, Whitworth (from Robertson to Roxbury) on the north, Roxbury and Beverwil on the west.  

The Mapping L.A. project of the Los Angeles Times, identifies a geographically similar area called Pico-Robertson.  It's street borders are: north, Gregory Way and Pico Boulevard; northeast, LeDoux Road and Olympic and San Vicente Boulevards, roughly Beverly Glen Drive; east, La Cienega Boulevard; south, Airdrome Street and Hillcrest Country Club; west, Robertson Boulevard, Beverly Green Drive and S. Roxbury Drive.

Neighborhoods in the South Robertson Neighborhood Council area

The following neighborhoods are within the boundaries established by the neighborhood council: Beverlywood, Castle Heights, Cheviot Hills, Crestview, La Cienega Heights and Reynier Village.

Population

2000
The 2000 U.S. census counted 18,019 residents in the 1,03-square-mile Pico-Robertson neighborhood—an average of 17,468 people per square mile, among the highest population densities for the city. In 2008, the city estimated that the population had increased to 19,253. The median age for residents was 36, older than the city at large; the percentages of residents aged 19 to 34 and 65 and older were among the county's highest.

The neighborhood was considered "not especially diverse" ethnically, with a high percentage of white people. The breakdown was whites, 73.5%;  Latinos, 7.3%; Asians, 5.7%; blacks, 5.6%; and others, 7.9%. Iran (37.2%) and Israel (5.7%) were the most common places of birth for the 34.6% of the residents who were born abroad—about the same percentage as in the city at large.

The median yearly household income in 2008 dollars was $63,356, an average figure for Los Angeles. The average household size of 2.1 people was low for Los Angeles. Renters occupied 73.1% of the housing stock and house- or apartment owners held 26.9%.

Education
The following public schools are within the council area:

Canfield, Crescent Heights, Shenandoah, and Castle Heights elementary schools
 Los Angeles Center for Enriched Studies
 Emerson Middle School
Hamilton High School

Jewish community

The neighborhood features more than thirty certified kosher restaurants, including delis, Chinese, Italian and Mexican restaurants, a donut shop, a frozen yogurt shop, bakeries, and butchers. The community features four men's mikvahs and one woman's mikvah, the largest known as the Los Angeles Mikvah.

There are several Jewish day schools located in the Pico-Robertson area. The Chabad community operates four schools, Bais Chaya Mushka and Bais Chana, both of which are on Pico Boulevard, as well as the newly relocated Cheder Menachem on La Cienega. Yeshiva University High School has campuses on both South Robertson Boulevard and West Pico Boulevard.

The community overall has a wide variety of Jewish denominational groups. Over the past two decades, the Orthodox community has grown to become the largest Jewish denomination in the area. This is evident in the growth of the Chabad community.

According to Chabad, the Hasidic movement has eleven centers in the immediate Pico-Robertson area, including the two high schools, boys cheder, day school, six synagogues, and a community center. Minyan Finder reports over twenty synagogues operating in the area.

In 1993, the neighborhood became home to the Los Angeles Museum of Tolerance.

See also
Neighborhood councils of Los Angeles

References

Jews and Judaism in Los Angeles
Neighborhoods in Los Angeles
Westside (Los Angeles County)
West Los Angeles